KKJZ (88.1 MHz FM, "K-Jazz 88.1") is a non-commercial public radio station in Southern California broadcasting from the Long Beach State campus. The station is one of several public radio stations in Southern California presenting jazz and blues.

The California State University Long Beach Foundation owns the non-commercial broadcast license for KKJZ; as a public radio station, it is funded by contributions from listener-members and other donors, with 75% of the station's funding coming from station memberships. Global Jazz, Inc., an affiliate of Mount Wilson FM Broadcasters, Inc., programs and manages the radio station.

The station's antenna is located on the top of Signal Hill in the Long Beach area, and its studios are located on campus at the Foundation Building.  KKJZ is also available through internet streaming audio and in Japan via direct broadcast satellite on MBCO (Mobile Broadcasting Corporation). According to U.S. Federal Communications Commission rules for a Class B station, KKJZ could broadcast with a maximum power of 50,000 watts using the same antenna height of 137 meters.

HD programming
KKJZ-HD1 (HD Radio) is a simulcast of the analog signal, which bills itself as "America's Jazz and Blues Station"; the format features mostly contemporary Jazz artists, such as Ramsey Lewis, Diana Krall, Herbie Hancock and (the late) Dave Brubeck.

KKJZ-HD2 is KJAZZ Cool Jazz.

KKJZ-HD3 is known as "22 West Radio", a station run and programmed by the students and faculty at Cal State University Long Beach.

History
On January 3, 1950 the station began broadcasting with the call letters 'KLON' and was owned by the Long Beach Unified School District. The station has been broadcasting jazz since 1981, when it was transferred to CSULB. The station changed its call sign to 'KKJZ' in July 2002. Prior to its Southern California location, the call letters KKJZ belonged to "Smooth Jazz 106.7" in Portland, Oregon.

The station had been broadcasting with 6,500 watts ERP, but in December 2004 the station upgraded its transmitter to 30,000 watts as well as an HD Radio digital signal. The station began broadcasting with 30,000 watts full-time on March 14, 2005.

The owner of KKJZ's non-commercial broadcast license, the California State University, Long Beach Foundation, has contracted with Global Jazz, Inc., a for-profit company, to program and manage the station. This agreement became effective on April 21, 2007.  Prior to that date the management and programming were performed by Pacific Public Radio, a non-profit organization created by the CSULB Foundation.

Global Jazz is an affiliate of Mount Wilson FM Broadcasters, Inc., owned by Saul Levine.  Levine is the owner of three radio stations in Southern California with non-jazz formats. One of his stations was converted from an all jazz format to the classical music station KMZT in 1990.  That station is now country-formatted KKGO, which was its call sign when it was a jazz station.

The assumption of station management by Global Jazz raised some questions among the station's staff and supporters.

The University of Redlands radio station, KUOR, which had for the last six years operated as a relay for KKJZ's programming to a large Inland Empire audience, switched to broadcasting Southern California Public Radio (SCPR), ending availability of KKJZ's programming to residents of Los Angeles' inland suburbs after reaching an agreement with SCPR that included nearly half-a-million dollars to upgrade and renovate the University of Redlands' studio and transmitter.

The Arbitron ratings in 2008 indicated KKJZ had the most listeners of all jazz stations in the United States and the fifth-highest number of listeners of public radio in the country.

On May 2, 2011, five time Grammy nominee pianist David Benoit made his debut as a morning host on the station.

Music events
 Long Beach Blues Festival: Traditionally held on Saturday and Sunday of the Labor Day weekend.  For most of the years it was held on the athletic field of the California State University, Long Beach campus.  In 2008, the 29th festival was held at Rainbow Lagoon in downtown Long Beach.
 Live broadcast of the Playboy Jazz Festival from the Hollywood Bowl.

Long-time jazz disc jockey Chuck Niles (aka "Bebop Charlie") is the only jazz disc jockey to have a star on the Hollywood Walk of Fame. Horace Silver, Louie Bellson, and Bob Florence ("Bebop Charlie", "Nilestones"), and others have written tunes for “Carlitos Niles”. Chuck Niles was a DJ for KKJZ from 1990 until he died in 2004. Niles also appeared in small parts in several films.

KJAZZ is the official emergency broadcast station for the City of Long Beach.

See also
 List of jazz radio stations in the United States

References

External links

KKJZ official website
live streaming audio of KKJZ plus two other streaming audio channels: Mostly Bop (bebop) & 88 Greats (classic jazz as chosen by station members)

California State University, Long Beach
Mass media in Long Beach, California
KKJZ
KJZ
KJZ
Radio stations established in 1975